Brian Armstrong (born January 25, 1983) is an American business executive, billionaire and investor who is CEO of cryptocurrency platform Coinbase. He received media attention for his policy of keeping the workplace free of political activism.

Early life and education 
Armstrong was born on January 25, 1983, near San Jose, California; both of his parents were engineers. During his years in high school he attended Bellarmine College Preparatory, a Catholic, all-male, private secondary school. Armstrong attended Rice University in Texas, and earned a dual bachelor's degree in economics and computer science in 2005, followed by a master's in computer science in 2006. While at Rice, he started a business matching tutors to students, and after graduating, spent a year in Buenos Aires while working for an education company.

Career 

Armstrong's early career included working as a developer for IBM and consultant at Deloitte. In 2010, he came across the Bitcoin white paper published under the alias Satoshi Nakamoto. In 2011, he joined Airbnb as a software engineer, and was exposed to payment systems in the 190 countries Airbnb operated in at the time. While at Airbnb, he saw the difficulties of sending money to South America. He began working weekends and nights to write code in Ruby and JavaScript to buy and store cryptocoins. In 2012, he entered the Y Combinator startup accelerator and received a $150,000 investment, which he used to fund Coinbase.
His post on Hacker News looking for a co-founder to get into the Y Combinator program later became a viral post in Hacker News. He eventually met his co-founder Fred Ehrsam on a reddit subgroup and is quoted to have done fifty plus dates to find that perfect co-founder.

Coinbase

In 2012, Armstrong and Fred Ehrsam co-founded Coinbase, as a way for cryptocurrency enthusiasts to trade bitcoins and other digital currencies. Armstrong was its first CEO. A 2018 funding round valued the company at $8.1 billion, and in December 2020, the company filed with the SEC to go public through a direct listing. Following a direct listing in April 2021, Coinbase's market capitalization rose to $85B, and according to Forbes, Armstrong has a net worth of $2.4 billion.

Book/Documentary
Armstrong appeared in the 2014 American documentary The Rise and Rise of Bitcoin.

He was featured in the 2020 nonfiction book Kings of Crypto: One Startup's Quest to Take Cryptocurrency Out of Silicon Valley and Onto Wall Street.

Armstrong and Coinbase were the subject of the documentary COIN: A Founder's Story, directed by Emmy-winner Greg Kohs.

ResearchHub
Armstrong self-funded and founded the scientific research site ResearchHub, modeled on the GitHub code repository, as a way of making research papers available to the public.

Political views 
Armstrong wrote a blog post  in September 2020 calling Coinbase a "Mission Focused Company", discouraging employee activism and discussion of political and social issues at work. He offered severance packages for Coinbase employees uncomfortable with this policy; as a result, sixty employees (amounting to 5% of the company) left Coinbase. Prior to this, Armstrong supported the Black Lives Matter movement and tweeted when George Floyd was murdered: "I've decided to speak up. It's a shame that this even needs to be said in this day and age, but racism, police brutality, and unequal justice are unequivocally wrong, and we need to all work to eliminate them from society."

Recognition
In 2017, at age 34, Armstrong was ranked #10 on Fortune 40 under 40 list.

In 2019, Armstrong was named to Time magazine's 100 Next list.

In 2021, Forbes named Armstrong #1 on its Crypto Rich List, with an estimated net worth of $6.5 billion as of February 2021. He was also listed 60th on the Forbes 400 list of the richest people in America.

Philanthropy 
In 2018, Armstrong was the first cryptocurrency executive to sign the Giving Pledge, when he pledged to give away the bulk of his wealth to philanthropic causes. He also set up a philanthropic effort called GiveCrypto.org, to allow people to make public or anonymous donations to help others living in poverty.

References

External links 
 

1983 births
21st-century philanthropists
American billionaires
American software engineers
American technology chief executives
Businesspeople from California
Giving Pledgers
Living people
People associated with Bitcoin
Rice University alumni